Midville may refer to:

Midville, Georgia, a city in the United States
Midville, Lincolnshire, a village in the United Kingdom

See also
 
 Mudville (disambiguation)